Michael Gernsøe (born 22 May 1971) is a Danish former professional footballer who played as a striker.

Gernsøe made an impressive breakthrough under head coach Torben Storm as part of the Fremad Amager team in 1995–96. This prompted a move to Belgian club Cercle Brugge in 1996. After eight league appearances, he returned to Denmark to play for Hvidovre IF.

He retired from football in November 2007, after having played several years for lower tier club AB 70.

References

1971 births
Living people
Footballers from Copenhagen
Danish men's footballers
Fremad Amager players
Cercle Brugge K.S.V. players
Hvidovre IF players
Hellerup IK players
AB Tårnby players
Danish Superliga players
Belgian Pro League players
Association football forwards
Danish expatriate men's footballers
Expatriate footballers in Belgium
Danish expatriate sportspeople in Belgium